Auburn is a census-designated place and unincorporated community in Walsh County, North Dakota, United States. Its population was 48 as of the 2010 census.

History
A post office called Auburn was established in 1883, and remained in operation until 1943. With the construction of the railroad, business activity shifted to nearby Grafton, and the town's population dwindled.

Geography
Auburn is located at  (48.506944, -97.439722).

Demographics

2010 census
As of the census of 2010, there were 48 people, 17 households, and 11 families in the CDP. The racial makeup of the CDP was 100.0% White. Hispanic or Latino of any race were 6.3% of the population.

There were 17 households, of which 23.5% had children under the age of 18 living with them, 47.1% were married couples living together, 11.8% had a female householder with no husband present, 5.9% had a male householder with no wife present, and 35.3% were non-families. 35.3% of all households were made up of individuals, and 11.8% had someone living alone who was 65 years of age or older. The average household size was 2.82 and the average family size was 3.73.

The median age in the CDP was 43.5 years. 27.1% of residents were under the age of 18; 10.4% were between the ages of 18 and 24; 12.5% were from 25 to 44; 33.3% were from 45 to 64; and 16.7% were 65 years of age or older. The gender makeup of the CDP was 58.3% male and 41.7% female.

References

Census-designated places in Walsh County, North Dakota
Census-designated places in North Dakota
Unincorporated communities in North Dakota
Unincorporated communities in Walsh County, North Dakota